Zoubir Zmit (born June 11, 1975 in Meftah) is an Algerian football player. He currently plays for MO Constantine in the Algerian Ligue Professionnelle 2.

Club career
On August 14, 2010, Zmit joined CS Constantine, signing a contract with the club. In his first season with the club, he helped the club win the 2010–11 Algerian Ligue Professionnelle 2 and gain promotion back to the Algerian Ligue Professionnelle 1.

In 2013 Zmit was suspended for 3 months after he failed a drug test.

Honours
 Won the Algerian Cup twice with MC Alger in 2006 and 2007
 Won the Algerian Super Cup twice with MC Alger in 2006 and 2007
 Won the Algerian Ligue Professionnelle 2 once with CS Constantine in 2011

References

External links
 DZFoot Profile
 

1975 births
Living people
Algerian footballers
Algerian Ligue 2 players
People from Meftah
CS Constantine players
MC Alger players
MC Oran players
RC Kouba players
USM Blida players
Association football midfielders
Algerian Ligue Professionnelle 1 players
MO Constantine players
Doping cases in association football
21st-century Algerian people